is a railway station in the city of Utsunomiya, Tochigi, Japan, operated by the East Japan Railway Company (JR East).

Lines
Through services to and from the Tokaido Line and Yokosuka Line are also provided via the Shonan-Shinjuku Line and Ueno-Tokyo Line.

Station layout
This station has an elevated station building, located above one side platform and one island platform serving three tracks. However, platform 2 is not in use. The station has a Midori no Madoguchi staffed ticket office.

Platforms

History
Suzumenomiya Station opened on 16 July 1895. With the privatization of JNR on 1 April 1987, the station came under the control of JR East. The current station building was completed in March 2011.

Passenger statistics
In fiscal 2019, the station was used by an average of 4663 passengers daily (boarding passengers only).

Surrounding area
 JGSDF Camp Utsunomiya
 Suzumenomiya Jinja
 
 JGSDF Camp Kita-Utsunomiya

See also
 List of railway stations in Japan

References

External links

  JR East station information 

Stations of East Japan Railway Company
Railway stations in Tochigi Prefecture
Tōhoku Main Line
Utsunomiya Line
Railway stations in Japan opened in 1895
Shōnan-Shinjuku Line
Utsunomiya